Business marketing is a marketing practice of individuals or organizations (including commercial businesses, governments, and institutions). It allows them to sell products or services to other companies or organizations that resell them, use them in their products or services, or use them to support their works. It is a way to promote business and improve profit too.

Business marketing is also known as industrial marketing or business-to-business (B2B) marketing. Business-to-government marketing, while still classified within the B2B discipline due to the sharing of dynamics, does differ slightly.

Origins 

The practice of a purveyor of goods trading with another may be as old as commerce itself. In relation to marketing today, its history is more recent. Michael Morris, Leyland Pitt, and Earl Dwight Honeycutt say that for several years business marketing took "a back seat" to consumer marketing. This entailed providers of goods or services selling directly to households through mass media and retail channels. David Lichtenthal (professor of marketing at Zicklin School of Business) notes in his research that business marketing has existed since the mid-19th century. He adds that the bulk of research on business marketing has come in the last 25 years.

This began to change in the middle to late 1970s. Academic periodicals, including the Journal of Business-to-Business Marketing and the Journal of Business & Industrial Marketing now publish studies on the subject regularly. Professional conferences on business marketing are held every year and courses are commonplace at many universities today. According to Jeremy Kourdi, more than half of marketing majors start their careers in business marketing rather than consumer marketing.

Internal and external efficiency 
The internal efficiency of a business entity is the factor by which it prepares a product or service in a cost efficient manner. The external efficiency of a business entity is the factor by which it effectively markets itself so as to utilise the market, in order to retrieve maximum profits from that internal efficiency. So in a b2b market setting, the external efficiencies of the business entities due to conduct trade is vital to the success of the b2b transaction, especially if they belong to the same concern, in which case an internal market between the co-owned business entities is emergent. Being able to make use of external economies of scale within the same ownership group is actually one of the motivations for creating a concern.

Business and consumer markets (B2C) 

Business markets have derived demand – a demand in them exists because of demand in the consumer market. An example would be a government wishing to purchase equipment for a nuclear power plant. Another example would be when items are in popular demand. The underlying consumer demand that has triggered this is that people are consuming more electricity (by using more household devices such as washing machines and computers). Business markets do not exist in isolation.

A single consumer market demand can give rise to hundreds of business market demands. The demand for cars creates demands for castings, forgings, plastic components, steel, and tires. In turn, this creates demands for casting sand, forging machines, mining materials, polymers, and rubber. Each of these growing demands has triggered more demands.

As the spending power of citizens increases, countries generally see an upward wave in their economies. Cities or countries with growing consumption are generally growing business markets.

Vs. consumer marketing 

Despite the differences between business and consumer marketing from a surface perspective being seemingly obvious, there are more subtle distinctions between the two with substantial ramifications. Dwyer and Tanner note that business marketing generally entails shorter and more direct channels of distribution.

While consumer marketing is aimed at large groups through mass media and retailers, the negotiation process between the buyer and seller is more personal in business marketing. According to Hutt and Speh (2004), most business marketers commit only a small part of their promotional budgets to advertising, and that is usually through direct mail efforts and trade journals. While advertising is limited, it often helps the business marketer set up successful sales calls.

Both business to business (B2B) and business-to-consumer (B2C) marketing is done with the ultimate intention of making a profit to the seller (business-to-business marketing). In B2C, B2B and B2G marketing situations, the marketer must always:

 successfully match the product or service strengths with the needs of a definable target market;
 position and price to align the product or service with its market, often an intricate balance; and
 communicate and sell it in the fashion that demonstrates its value effectively to the target market.

These are the fundamental principles of the 4 Ps of marketing (the marketing mix) first documented by E. Jerome McCarthy in 1960.

While "other businesses" might seem like the simple answer, Dwyer and Tanner say business customers fall into four broad categories: companies that consume products or services, government agencies, institutions and resellers.

The first category includes original equipment manufacturers, such as large auto-makers who buy gauges to put in their cars and also small firms owned by 1–2 individuals who purchase products to run their business. The second category, government agencies, is the biggest. In fact, the U.S. government is the biggest single purchaser of products and services in the country, spending more than $300 billion annually. But this category also includes state and local governments. The third category, institutions, includes schools, hospitals and nursing homes, churches and charities. Finally, resellers consist of wholesalers, brokers and industrial distributors.

So what are the meaningful differences between B2B and B2C marketing?
 A notable characteristic of B2B marketing is that it is rarely 'product first' or 'service first'. Marketing messages lead with significant context that acknowledges the customer's need or problem first and then establishes the relevance of the vendor's product or service to the customer's situation.   In B2C marketing, the product or service features and benefits are called out up front. The customer is expected to already know why they need the product or service.
 The buyer or customer is often a group or committee or department comprising several individuals who have specific roles in evaluating the proposed product or service.  In B2C, the buyer is mostly an individual who needs the product or service for his or her own use. Offerings are evaluated mainly on price, reviews and word of mouth, although these are factors in B2B marketing as well

A B2C sale is to a "Consumer" i.e. to a single person who pays for the transaction. A B2B sale is to a "Business" i.e. organization or firm. Given the complexity of organizational structure, B2B sales typically involve multiple decision makers.

While the structure of a B2B sale involving an organization is understood, the psychology of a B2B sale, particularly from a marketing perspective, is not always devoid of human emotion. According to Bill Blaney (2012), a B2C and a B2B sale can be differentiated by the customer as either a "want" or a "need." While retail consumer sales rarely hinge upon a product or service that customers "need" in order to survive (pharmaceutical and other health industry products notwithstanding), business sales are more directly applied to the growth and survival of that particular company, organization or institution. As a result, marketing to businesses relies on communication that can provide the company buyer with a level of comfort in the long-term performance of their product or service, and support in its continued efficacy.

The marketing mix is affected by the B2B uniqueness which include complexity of business products and services, diversity of demand and the differing nature of the sales itself (including fewer customers buying larger volumes). Because there are some important subtleties to the B2B sale, the issues are broken down beyond just the original 4 Ps of marketing developed by McCarthy.

Strategies

B2B branding
B2B branding is different from B2C in some crucial ways, including the need to align corporate brands, divisional brands and product/service brands and to apply brand standards to material often considered “informal” such as email and other electronic correspondence. It is mainly of large scale when compared with B2C.

Product (or service) 
Due to the fact that business customers are focused on creating shareholder value for themselves, the cost-saving or revenue-producing benefits of products and services are important to factor in throughout the product development and marketing cycles.

Target market 
Quite often, the target market for a business product or service is smaller and has more specialized needs reflective of a specific industry or niche. A B2B niche, a segment of the market, can be described in terms of firmographics which requires marketers to have good business intelligence in order to increase response rates.  Regardless of the size of the target market, the business customer is making an organizational purchase decision and the dynamics of this, both procedurally and in terms of how they value the product offered, differ dramatically from the consumer market. There may be multiple influencers on the purchase decision, which may also have to be marketed to, though they may not be members of the decision making unit.  In addition the research and decision making process a B2B buyer undertakes will be more extensive.  Finally the purchase information that buyers are researching changes as they go through the buying process.

Pricing 
The business market can be convinced to pay premium prices more often than the consumer market with appropriate pricing structure and payment terms. This pricing premium is particularly achievable if it is supported with a strong brand.

Promotion 
Promotion planning is relatively easy when the decision making habits of the customer base and the vocabulary unique to their segment are known. Specific trade shows, analysts, publications, blogs and retail/wholesale outlets tend to be fairly common to each industry/product area. Once it is figured out for the industry/product, writing the promotion plan is simple. Promotion techniques rely heavily on marketing communications strategies. Promotion in digital marketing is as synonymous and vital as it is in physical marketing as it involves persuasion and advertising and the goal of advertising is to elicit a response.

Communications methodologies 

The purpose of B2B marketing communications is to support the organizations' sales effort and improve company profitability. B2B marketing communications tactics generally include advertising, public relations, direct mail, trade show support, sales collateral, branding, and interactive services such as website design and search engine optimization. The Business Marketing Association is the trade organization that serves B2B marketing professionals. It was founded in 1922 and offers certification programs, research services, conferences, industry awards and training programs.

Positioning statement 
An important first step in business to business marketing is the development of a positioning statement. This is a statement of what is done and how it will be better and more efficient than competitors.

Developing messages 
The next step is to develop messages.  There is usually a primary message that conveys more strongly to customers, what is done and how the customers benefit from it. This is often supported by a number of secondary messages, each of which may have a number of supporting arguments, facts and figures.

Campaign plans 
A comprehensive plan to target resources where they will deliver the best return on investment. The infrastructure to support each stage of the marketing process has to be in place and the entire organization must be geared up to handle the inquiries appropriately.

Briefing an agency 
A standard briefing document is usually a good idea for briefing an agency, as well as focusing the agency on what is important in the campaign. It serves as a checklist of all the important things to consider as part of the brief.  Typical elements to an agency brief are: objectives, target market, target audience, product, campaign description, product positioning, graphical considerations, corporate guidelines, and any other supporting material and distribution.

Considering results 
The value in results measurement is in tying the marketing campaign back to business results. Metrics to measure the impact are  e.g. cost per acquisition, cost per lead or tangible changes in customer perception.

Size 

Hutt and Speh (2001) note that "business marketers serve the largest market of all; the dollar volume of transactions in the industrial or business market significantly exceeds that of the ultimate consumer market." For example, they note that companies such as GE, DuPont and IBM spend more than $60 million a day on purchases to support their operations.

Dwyer and Tanner (2006) say the purchases made by companies, government agencies and institutions "account for more than half of the economic activity in industrialized countries such as the United States, Canada and France."

A 2003 study sponsored by the Business Marketing Association estimated that business-to-business marketers in the United States spend about $85 billion a year to promote their goods and services. The BMA study breaks that spending out as follows (figures are in billions of dollars):

 Trade Shows/Events -- $17.3
 Internet/Electronic Media -- $12.5
 Promotion/Market Support -- $10.9
 Magazine Advertising -- $10.8
 Publicity/Public Relations -- $10.5
 Direct Mail -- $9.4
 Dealer/Distributor Materials -- $5.2
 Market Research -- $3.8
 Telemarketing -- $2.4
 Directories -- $1.4
 Other -- $5.1
Despite the stream of leads and undeniable impact of marketing in B2B organizations, a 2021 report by Statista states that majority of businesses only allocate 5% of their budget towards promotions. This is a far cry from B2C companies who typically spend 5% to 12% of their total revenue towards marketing.

Growth 

The tremendous growth and change that business marketing is experiencing is largely due to three "revolutions" occurring around the world today, according to Morris, Pitt and Honeycutt (2001).

 Technological revolution. Technology is changing at an unprecedented pace, and these changes are speeding up the pace of new product and service development. A large part of that has to do with the Internet, which is discussed in more detail below. Technology and business strategy go hand in hand. Both are correlated.  While technology supports forming organization strategy, the business strategy is also helpful in technology development. Both play a role in business marketing.
Entrepreneurial revolution. To stay competitive, many companies have downsized and reinvented themselves. Adaptability, flexibility, speed, aggressiveness and innovativeness are the keys to remaining competitive today. Marketing is taking the entrepreneurial lead by finding market segments, untapped needs and new uses for existing products, and by creating new processes for sales, distribution and customer service.
(Occurring within marketing itself) Companies are looking beyond traditional assumptions and they are adopting new frameworks, theories, models and concepts. They are also moving away from the mass market and the preoccupation with the transaction. Relationships, partnerships and alliances are what define marketing today. The cookie-cutter approach is out. Companies are customizing marketing programs to individual accounts.

Impact of the Internet 

The Internet has become an integral component of the customer relationship management strategy for business marketers. Dwyer and Tanner (2006) note that business marketers not only use the Internet to improve customer service but also to gain opportunities with distributors.

According to Anderson and Narus (2004), two new types of resellers have emerged as by-products of the Internet: infomediaries and metamediaries. Infomediaries, such as Google and Yahoo, are search engine companies that also function as brokers, or middlemen, in the business marketing world. They charge companies fees to find information on the Web as well as for banner and pop-up ads and search engine optimization services. Metamediaries are companies with robust Internet sites that furnish customers with multiproduct, multivendor and multiservice marketspace in return for commissions on sales.

With the advent of b-to-b exchanges, the Internet ushered in an enthusiasm for collaboration that never existed before—and in fact might have even seemed ludicrous 10 years ago. For example, a decade ago who would have imagined Ford, General Motors and DaimlerChrysler entering into a joint venture? That's exactly what happened after all three of the Big Three began moving their purchases online in the late 1990s. All three companies were pursuing their own initiatives when they realized the economies of scale they could achieve by pooling their efforts. Thus was born what then was the world's largest Internet business when Ford's Auto-Xchange and GM's TradeXchange merged, with DaimlerChrysler representing the third partner.

While this exchange did not stand the test of time, others have, including Agentrics, which was formed in 2005 with the merger of WorldWide Retail Exchange and GlobalNetXchange, or GNX. Agentrics serves more 50 retailers around the world and more than 300 customers, and its members have combined sales of about $1 trillion. Hutt and Speh (2001) note that such virtual marketplaces enable companies and their suppliers to conduct business in real time as well as simplify purchase processes and cut costs.

This trend only further extended during the COVID-19 pandemic as more businesses were forced to move more of their business strictly online for customer management and new lead engagement.

See also
 Business-to-business marketing
Business-to-consumer marketing
Business-to-government marketing
 Industrial marketing 
 Marketing

Footnotes 
 Anderson, James C., and Narus, James A. (2004) Business Market Management: Understanding, Creating, and Delivering Value, 2nd Edition, 2004, Pearson Education, Inc. 
 Business Marketing Association (2003) "Marketing Reality Survey"
 Blaney, Bill (2012) B2B A To Z. Marketing Tools and Strategies That Generate Leads For Business-To-Business Companies, Denham Publishing, 2012. p. 8-12 
 
 
 
 Morris, Michael H., Pitt, Leyland F., and Honeycutt, Earl Dwight (2001) Business-to-Business Marketing: A Strategic Approach, Sage Publications Inc.
 
 Brown, Duncan and Hayes, Nick. Influencer Marketing: Who really influences your customers?, Butterworth-Heinemann, 2008
 John Fahy and David Jobber, Foundations of marketing, Rogan (2011: p137)

References 

Business-to-business
Marketing by target group